Pimpinella cypria, common name Cyprus burnet-saxifrage and locally Kıbrıs Pimpinela, is a herbaceous perennial plant belonging to the family Apiaceae.

Description
Pimpinella cypria is an erect soft-haired perennial to 70 cm with stout woody rootstock clad in old leaf-sheaths; stems furrowed; basal leaves pinnate with 3-5 oval blunt-toothed and lobed segments to 4 cm long; stem leaves few, similar or with narrow divisions; umbels terminal, in a loose panicle, with 6-14 rays; flowers many in each umbellule, the petals dirty white unequally 2-lobed, about 1 mm. Fruit narrowly oval, 4 mm. Flowers from April to May.

Habitat
Limestone fissures in many north-facing shady spots.

Distribution
In the Kyrenia Range from Kornos to Yaila and near Eptakomi. Endemic to North Cyprus.

References

External links
 Pimpinella cypria Boiss.— The Plant List

cypria
Endemic flora of Cyprus
Taxa named by Pierre Edmond Boissier